Endler is a surname. Notable people with the surname include:

 Adolf Endler (1930–2009), German lyric poet, essayist, and prose author
 Christiane Endler (born 1991), Chilean football goalkeeper
 John Endler (born 1947), ethologist and evolutionary biologist
 Michaela Endler (born 1945), German cross-country skier